Guess What may refer to:
 Guess What (Canadian game show), a 1983–1987 Canadian game show that aired on CTV
 Guess What (U.S. game show), a 1952 American game show that aired on DuMont network
 "Guess What" (song), a song by Syleena Johnson
 Guess What? a 1990 picture book for children